Songs of a Love Affair is the debut studio album by American country artist Jean Shepard. The album was released in 1956 on Capitol Records and was produced by Ken Nelson. The release has been said to have been one of country music's first concept albums in history and also one of the first to be released by a female country music artist.

Background and content 
Songs of a Love Affair comprised twelve tracks of recorded material. The record was recorded in five separate recording sessions at the Capitol Recording Studio in Hollywood, California. The first took place August 26, 1953. It was not until two years later that the album's production was concluded in four separate recording sessions in between December 27 and December 30, 1955. Dan Cooper and Stephen Thomas Erlewine of Allmusic noted that Songs of a Love Affair was "arguably the first concept album in country music history," as it was one of the first official LP albums issued in country music and by female artists. Country music authority Rich Kienzle made much the same point in the 1990s.  The album itself acquired its name from the songs themes that depicted a marriage that was ended by a love affair. One side of the record is written from a romance's dissolution. Songs such as "Passing Love Affair", "Shadows on the Wall", and "Hello Old Broken Heart" depicted the album's theme. The material consisted of all new material, and none were cover versions of other songs. The ninth track entitled "Sad Singin' and Slow Ridin'" was written by country artists Curly Fox and Texas Ruby. The fifth track "Hello Old Broken Heart" was composed by songwriters Joe Allison and Audrey Allison, who would later write the number one single "He'll Have to Go" for Jim Reeves.

Release 
Songs of a Love Affair was released as Jean Shepard's debut studio album in 1956 and was the only album she released that year. The album did chart any Billboard Magazine albums list upon its release. Singles were not originally issued from the release, however in 1960 the songs "The Mysteries of Life" and "Did I Turn Down a Better Deal" were spawned from the record. Although two singles were sent to radio, neither charted the Billboard Magazine Hot Country Songs chart or make the Billboard Magazine Hot 100 list either. The record was originally issued as a 12-inch LP album, and contained six songs on each side of the record. Allmusic reviewed Songs of a Love Affair and gave it four in half out five stars, however a written review was not provided. The album was reissued on the Avid label.

Track listing 
Side one
"A Passing Love Affair" – (Jack Rhodes, Jack Rollins)
"Shadows on the Wall" – (Ronnie Badger, Tommy Reiff)
"Girls in Disgrace" – (Mary McDaniel, Dan Welch)
"Over and Over" – (McDaniel, Welch)
"Hello Old Broken Heart" – (Audrey Allison, Joe Allison)
"The Mysteries of Life" – (Virgil F. Stewart)

Side two
"Tell Me What I Want to Hear" – (Gertrude Cox, Rhodes)
"I'll Thank You All My Life" – (Lucille Dean, Dick Reynolds)
"Sad Singin' and Slow Ridin'" – (Curly Fox, Texas Ruby)
"Did I Turn Down a Better Deal" – (Tommy Collins)
"I Married You for Love" – (Rhodes)
"It's Hard to Tell the Married from the Free" – (Don Helms, Gene Jackson)

Personnel 
 Tommy Collins – guitar
 John Cuivello – drums
 Clarence Lee – bass
 Red Murrell – bass
 Fuzzy Owen – guitar
 Buck Owens – guitar
 Jelly Sanders – fiddle
 Jean Shepard – lead vocals
 Lewis Talley – guitar
 Bill Woods – leader, piano

References 

1956 debut albums
Jean Shepard albums
Albums produced by Ken Nelson (United States record producer)
Capitol Records albums